Basketball in Guyana is a top sport in Guyana.

Its national teams have won several medals at the FIBA CBC Championship. Georgetown, Guyana hosted the event several times.

Guyana has two basketball leagues.

GABA DIV 1 
 Pacesetters
 Ravens
 Nets
 Colts
 Scorpions
 Sonics
 Maccabees
 Legends
 Disciples
 Eagles

LABA DIV 1 
 Kings
 Raiders
 Pistons
 Royals
 Bulls
 Jets
 Scheme Unit
 Panthers
 Patriots

See also
 Guyana men's national basketball team
 Guyana women's national basketball team

References